Rabat-Agdal train station (Arabic) is located in the Agdal district, in Rabat, Morocco. It was first renovated in 2004, before undergoing a major redevelopment in the 2010s to accommodate the Al Boraq high-speed service.

History 
The station was originally built in 1925..

It was rebuilt to accommodate the Al Boraq service in 2018.

Passenger service

Train services 
The station is notably served by the Al Boraq high-speed service.

Intermodal connections 
The station is served by buses from the ALSA-City Bus network:
 Along the Avenue Haj Ahmed Cherkaoui - lines 30 (Trambus) and 35;
 Along the Avenue Hassan II - lines 31, 32, 33, 34, 34B, 36, 38, 101 and 106.

See also 
 Le Bouregreg, railway network of the Rabat metropolitan area
 Rail transport in Morocco

References

External links 

Images of Rabat-Agdal Station
 Official site of the ONCF

Railway stations in Morocco